The 2021 Premier Lacrosse League season was the third season of the Premier Lacrosse League (PLL). The 2021 season represented a return to the tour-based format that the league followed in 2019 after playing a bubble tournament in 2020 due to the COVID-19 Pandemic. 2021 also represented a return to one unified professional Field Lacrosse format after Major League Lacrosse and the Premier Lacrosse League announced they were merging on December 16, 2020. This monumental merger saw the PLL adopt the naming rights to all former MLL teams, as well as Cannons Lacrosse Club moving from the MLL to the PLL as an 8th team set by expansion draft. The Whipsnakes Lacrosse Club were the two-time defending league champions. Chaos Lacrosse Club took revenge against Whipsnakes Lacrosse Club by defeating them in the championship game on September 19th at Audi field by a score of 9-14.

Expansion
The addition of an eighth team, the Cannons Lacrosse Club, allows for schedule flexibility and natural bye weeks to occur for each team throughout the season. While the MLL fielded six teams last season and the PLL fielded seven, the post-merger PLL chose to expand by only one team to maintain the highest level of competition. The Cannons will form their initial PLL roster core through an expansion draft of unprotected players from the other seven clubs. Former MLL players will have a chance to join a roster through a new player draft, occurring on March 25.

Player movement 
The 2021 PLL waiver wire and trading period began on February 9. On February 28, expansion draft protected rosters are due and the waiver wire closes. On March 11, the Cannons Lacrosse Club will conduct their expansion draft and on March 25, the entire league will participate in an entry draft for former MLL players. The waiver wire will then reopen for the Cannons on March 26 and for the rest of the teams on March 30. The 2021 collegiate draft will be held on April 6. The conclusion of player movement through trade windows and the waiver wire is set for April 30.

Waiver wire 
The first league waiver wire period began on February 9. Notable players to change teams at this time included:

Trades 
The following notable trades were made during the 2021 league year:
 February 11: Atlas traded A Rob Pannell to the Redwoods for the third overall pick in the 2021 Entry Draft and a second round pick in the 2022 College Draft.
 February 25: Chaos traded A Connor Fields to the Archers for M Ian MacKay.
 February 28: Atlas send M Paul Rabil and the sixth overall pick in the 2021 Entry Draft to the Cannons for the ninth overall pick in the 2021 Entry Draft, eighth overall pick in the 2021 College Draft, and a 2022 College Draft first round selection.
March 2: Atlas send A Ryan Brown to the Waterdogs for the eleventh overall pick in the 2021 College Draft.

Notable retirements 
The following notable players retired prior to the 2021 season:
Kevin Buchanan (A) – Began his professional field career with the Los Angeles Riptide in 2008. Also spent time with the Bayhawks, Chicago Machine, and Boston Cannons. Buchanan spent the last two seasons with the Chaos Lacrosse Club. He retires with 282 career points outdoors. At the time of his retirement, Buchanan also had 421 points in the NLL.
Matt Danowski (A) – Seven-time All-Star, Three-time All-Pro, and Co-Captain of the 2018 World Champion Team USA. Played for the Pride, Lizards, Hounds, Bayhawks, and Chrome during his 13-year career.
Jeremy Sieverts (M) – Seven-time All-Star and five-time champion in both the MLL and PLL after going undrafted. Played eleven season with the Bayhawks, Outlaws, and Whipsnakes.
Ty Warner (SSDM) – Drafted by the Florida Launch in 2018. Two-time PLL champion with the Whipsnakes and George Boiardi Hard Hat SSDM of the year (2020 PLL Championship Series). Warner announced he was stepping away from lacrosse to focus on medical school and his rights will be retained by the Whipsnakes through the 2022 season should he choose to return.

Other retirements

Retirements after season

John Galloway (G) – While in goal at Syracuse, he a two-time Division I Goalie of the year and a two-time national champion. Played for Team USA in the 2018 World Championships, winning a gold medal. In his last professional Lacrosse game with the Chrome on August 15, 2021, he had 12 GA, 14 saves, with a .538% save percentage. 
Joel White (LSM) – A two-time National Champion and three-time All-American at Syracuse. A gold medalist for Team USA at the 2018 World Championships. His last professional lacrosse game with the Chrome was on August 15, 2021. He ended his 113 game career with 31 goals, 39 assists, 612 ground balls (4th in pro lacrosse history).
Kyle Harrison (M) – While at Johns Hopkins, he was a two-time National Champion, a Tewaaraton Award winner, NCAA Player of the Year, two-time Midfielder of the Year, and three-time All-American. He was also a two-time US National Team Player, seven-time All-Star and Professional Lacrosse Champion, He ended his career with the Redwoods on August 22, 2021 with 149 career goals, 82 assists, and 241 points.
Paul Rabil (M) – He is the face of professional lacrosse for over a decade. He was a four-time All-American at Johns Hopkins and a two-time NCAA Division I Champion. During a decorated 14-year pro career, Rabil was a two-time World Champion (gold medalist), a three-time Pro Lacrosse Champion, a three-time Pro Lacrosse MVP, and a PLL All-Star with Atlas. He ended his playing career with the Cannons and is the all-time leading scorer in pro field lacrosse. Rabil, the co-founder of the PLL, would continue to run the league's day-to-day operations.

Expansion Draft

The Cannons Expansion Draft took place on Thursday, March 11 to select an initial roster from players left unprotected by their team on March 1.

Expansion Draft Format:

 18 Round Draft
 Max 3 players selected per existing PLL team
 Existing teams will protect 14 players (1-2 goalies + 12-13 field players)
 Teams must protect players selected in the 2020 College Draft

Player Entry Draft 

All former MLL players, totaling more than 100 athletes, are currently without teams. Some of these players, along with NLL and other non-collegiate athletes without professional field experience, will be selected to team rosters in a specially formulated three-round draft on March 25. The expansion Cannons will be selecting first in each round and the selection slot of other teams was determined by lottery draw on February 10.

College Draft

Due to NCAA eligibility rules in response to the COVID-19 pandemic, many college seniors returned for a fifth year of eligibility in the spring 2021 season. As a result, this year's draft on April 26 was expected to be among the most talent saturated in years. It once again aired on NBCSN beginning at 10:30 EDT and hosted by Paul Burmeister, along with analyst Ryan Boyle on the broadcast. PLL coaches called in via video call for breakdowns of their draft picks.

Format:
Each club was awarded four picks, with the exception of Atlas LC and Chaos LC, which own six picks each. 
Eligible players must currently be in their senior season.

Coaching changes
Cannons Lacrosse Club – Following weeks of uncertainty, Sean Quirk was officially named the head coach of Cannons Lacrosse Club on January 19. Quirk served from 2016 through the 2020 season as the head coach of the MLL's Boston Cannons. In 2020, he was named MLL Coach of the Year. On February 9, the Cannons announced the return of John Klepacki (Boston Cannons) and addition of Sean Kirwan (Virginia) to the assistant coaching staff.

Tour Map

Schedule

The 2021 tour schedule will run eleven weeks long, including three playoff weekends and an All-Star game. A total of 43 games will take place in this time frame.

Championship
After falling in the 2020 PLL Championship in Utah last season as the underdog No. 7 seed, Chaos looked to avenge said loss against the same team this season in Whipsnakes, the two-time defending PLL champion. On the other hand, the Whips looked to solidify a dynasty to begin the PLL, hoping to secure a third title in the third year of the league's existence.

With a potent attack in players like Matt Rambo and Zed Williams, the Whips had the momentum and past success to favor them coming into the game on Sept. 19 at Audi Field in Washington D.C. However, it was Chaos who powered through and held that potent Whipsnakes attack silent as they won, 14-9, winning their first ever PLL Championship.

The Whips were held to just three goals in the second half and the aforementioned Williams/Rambo combo combined to record just two points and no goals in the championship. On the other end, it was Chaos's Dhane Smith who was the offensive star of the game and playoffs, recording a six-point game on the day. Smith had 18 points in the playoffs, averaging six points a game.

Three other players had four points or more for Chaos on the day in Chase Fraser, Josh Byrne and Chris Cloutier. Fraser's four goals led all scorers in the game. PLL league MVP Blaze Riorden turned in another MVP performance for Chaos in the championship, recording 15 saves in the game for a .625 save percentage. Riorden received PLL Championship Game MVP honors for his performance.

Championship Series bracket

Standings

Last updated: August 16, 2021

Source:

All Star Game

The 2021 All-Star Game took place on Sunday, July 18 at PayPal Park in San Jose, California. It was broadcast on NBCSN and was sponsored by Cloudstrike, including the teams: Adversaries and Defenders. The two teams captains were Grant Ament (Archers) and Blaze Riordan (Chaos) The Adversaries won with a score of 23–21 over The Defenders. The MVP award went to goalie Tim Troutner who had 24 saves, including a behind-the-back goal, in a close win. With a total of 35 saves made in the game, $17,500 was donated to Oakland Lacrosse on behalf of Cloudstike with PLL Assist.

Award finalists 
On August 19, the PLL announced the finalists for the following awards:

Jim Brown Most Valuable Player 

 Grant Ament (Attack, Archers)
 Zach Currier (Midfield, Waterdogs)
 Blaze Riorden (Goalie, Chaos)
 Jeff Teat (Attack, Atlas)
 Lyle Thompson (Attack, Cannons)

Rookie of the Year 

 TD Ierlan (Faceoff, Redwoods)
 Stephen Rehfuss (Midfield, Cannons)
 Jeff Teat (Attack, Atlas)

Eamon McEneaney Attackman of the Year 

 Grant Ament (Archers)
 Rob Pannell (Redwoods)
 Jeff Teat (Atlas)
 Lyle Thompson (Cannons)
 Zed Williams (Whipsnakes)

Gait Brothers Midfielder of the Year 

 Bryan Costabile (Atlas)
 Zach Currier (Waterdogs)
 Myles Jones (Redwoods)
 Paul Rabil (Cannons)
 Tom Schreiber (Archers)

Dave Pietramala Defensive Player of the Year 

 Liam Byrnes (Waterdogs)
 Matt Dunn (Whipsnakes)
 Garrett Epple (Redwoods)
 Graeme Hossack (Archers)
 Jack Rowlett (Chaos)

Paul Cantabene Faceoff Man of the Year 

 Trevor Baptiste (Atlas)
 TD Ierlan (Redwoods)
 Joe Nardella (Whipsnakes)

Oren Lyons Goalie of the Year 

 Adam Ghitelman (Archers)
 Blaze Riorden (Chaos)
 Dillon Ward (Waterdogs)

Brodie Merrill Long Stick Midfielder of the Year 

 Michael Ehrhardt (Whipsnakes)
 Scott Ratliff (Archers)
 Ryland Rees (Waterdogs)

George Boiardi SSDM Hard Hat Award 

 Zach Goodrich (Cannons)
 Latrell Harris (Archers)
 Danny Logan (Atlas)
 Ryan Terefenko (Chrome)

Dick Edell Coach of the Year 

 Andy Copelan (Waterdogs)
 Ben Rubeor (Atlas)

Brendan Looney Leadership Award 

 Steven DeNapoli (SSDM, Waterdogs)
 Kyle Harrison (Midfield, Redwoods)
 Blaze Riorden (Goalie, Chaos)

Jimmy Regan Teammate Award 

 Mark Glicini (SSDM, Chaos)
 Jack Kelly (Goalie, Redwoods)
 Mikie Schlosser (Midfield, Waterdogs)

Welles Crowther Humanitarian Award 

 Kyle Harrison (Midfield, Redwoods)
 Eric Law (Attack, Atlas)
 Lyle Thompson (Attack, Cannons)

Dave Huntley Sportsmanship Award 

 Adam Ghitelman (Goalie, Archers)
 Eric Law (Attack, Atlas)
 Zed Williams (Attack, Whipsnakes)

Award Winners

Source:

Records, milestones, and notable statistics
 January 12 – The league reveals edits to the former Boston Cannons logo, a team crest, and motto for the upcoming season.

League leaders

Last Updated: August 16, 2021

Source:

References 

Premier Lacrosse League
Premier Lacrosse League
Lacrosse